MX 2002 featuring Ricky Carmichael is a video game developed by Pacific Coast Power & Light and published by THQ for the PlayStation 2, Xbox and Game Boy Advance in 2001. It is the third motocross racing game published by THQ to be endorsed by professional motorcross racer Ricky Carmichael, after Championship Motocross featuring Ricky Carmichael and its sequel, Championship Motocross 2001 Featuring Ricky Carmichael, as well as the first game in THQ's MX trilogy, a follow-up series to the Championship Motorcross duology that would eventually become part of its MX vs. ATV crossover racing franchise.  A sequel, MX Superfly, was released in 2002 and also endorsed by Carmichael.

Development
MX 2002 originally began development as a sequel to Championship Motocross 2001 Featuring Ricky Carmichael, before undergoing significant changes that led it to be rebranded as the start of a new successor to the Championship Motocross duology. Tiertex Studios, which developed the Game Boy Color version of Championship Motocross 2001, developed a Game Boy Advance version of MX 2002 that similarly featured 3-D graphics.

Reception

The PlayStation 2 version received "generally favorable reviews", while the Xbox version received above-average reviews, according to the review aggregation website Metacritic. Jim Preston of NextGens September 2001 issue said of the former console version, "Ordinary graphics and an awkward stunt system are the only drawbacks in an otherwise fast and fun day in the dirt." The magazine later said of the latter console version in its final issue, "The ease of control and built-in tutorials keep everything surprisingly accessible – a very nice balance. [...] It's not bad at all, but there are more exciting racing and stunt titles out there."

References

External links
 
 

2001 video games
Game Boy Advance games
Motorcycle video games
Multiplayer and single-player video games
MX vs. ATV
PlayStation 2 games
RenderWare games
THQ games
Tiertex Design Studios games
Video games based on real people
Video games developed in the United States
Xbox games